Livingston is a town in Overton County, Tennessee, United States, and serves as the county seat.  The population was 3,905 at the 2020 census and 4,058 at the 2010 census. The current mayor, Curtis Hayes, began serving his mayoral position in September 2006.

Livingston is part of the Cookeville, Tennessee Micropolitan Statistical Area.

History
Livingston was named after Edward Livingston (1764–1836), who served as Secretary of State under President Andrew Jackson. In 1833, in a close and controversial election, the residents of Overton County voted to move the county seat from the town of Monroe to Livingston.

Geography
Livingston is located at  (36.386942, -85.325568), approximately 15 miles north by northeast of Cookeville.

Elevation in the town ranges from 1,027 ft (313 m) to 1700 ft (518.16 m)

Climate

Demographics

2020 census

As of the 2020 United States census, there were 3,905 people, 1,677 households, and 963 families residing in the town.

2000 census
As of the census of 2000, there were 3,498 people, 1,543 households, and 924 families residing in the town. The population density was 680.1 people per square mile (262.8/km2). There were 1,746 housing units at an average density of 339.5 per square mile (131.2/km2). The racial makeup of the town was 88.08% White, 0.60% African American, 5.29% Native American, 0.17% Asian, 0.14% Pacific Islander, 0.14% from other races, and 0.57% from two or more races. Hispanic or Latino of any race were 5.31% of the population.

Of the 1,543 households, 22.9% had children under the age of 18 living with them, 42.3% were married couples living together, 14.2% had a female householder with no husband present, and 40.1% were non-families. 37.1% of all households were made up of individuals, and 18.1% had someone living alone who was 65 years of age or older. The average household size was 2.15 and the average family size was 2.80.

The population was 20.0% under the age of 18, 8.6% from 18 to 24, 24.3% from 25 to 44, 23.8% from 45 to 64, and 23.2% who were 65 years of age or older. The median age was 43 years. For every 100 females, there were 83.1 males. For every 100 females age 18 and over, there were 77.5 males.

The median income for a household in the town was $23,309, and the median income for a family was $34,141. Males had a median income of $25,183 versus $20,991 for females. The per capita income for the town was $15,558. About 14.4% of families and 19.3% of the population were below the poverty line, including 32.7% of those under age 18 and 20.0% of those age 65 or over.

Education
Livingston is currently home to five schools: Livingston Academy (9-12), Livingston Middle School (5-8), and A.H. Roberts Elementary School (K-4).  Livingston is home to a branch campus of the Tennessee College of Applied Technology and a satellite campus of Volunteer State Community College.

Notable people
Michael J. McCulley, U.S. Astronaut
Albert H. Roberts, former Governor of Tennessee
Roy Roberts, Blues artist

References

External links

 Livingston, Tennessee — official site
 Livingston Academy
 Overton County Schools
 Livingston Enterprise
 Overton County News

Towns in Overton County, Tennessee
Towns in Tennessee
County seats in Tennessee
Cookeville, Tennessee micropolitan area